The 2005–06 WWHL season  was the second season of the Western Women's Hockey League. The Calgary Oval X-Treme enjoyed an undefeated season and claimed the WWHL Champions cup.

Final standings
Note: GP = Games played, W = Wins, L = Losses, T = Ties, GF = Goals for, GA = Goals against, Pts = Points.

Playoffs
Final round: Calgary Oval X-Treme vs. Minnesota Whitecaps
 Calgary Oval X-Treme win the WWHL Champions cup

Scoring Leaders

Goalie Leaders

References

External links
   Western Women's Hockey League

Western Women's Hockey League seasons
WWHL